Sir Edmund Poley (1619–1671) was one of the two MPs for Bury St Edmunds between 1661 and 1671.

References

Poley